Bridgewater Historic District is a national historic district located at Bridgewater, Rockingham County, Virginia. The district encompasses 127 contributing buildings and 1 contributing site in the central business district and surrounding residential areas of the town of Bridgewater.  It includes a variety of residential, commercial, and institutional buildings most of which date from the 19th century and early-20th century. Notable buildings include the Jacob Dinkle House, the St. Claire Kyle House, the J. G. Brown House, Dr. T. H. B. Brown House, the Hite House, Childress House, Whitmore House, the O. W. Miller House, Dr. Strickler House, Masonic Lodge, Methodist Church (1841), Baptist Church (1855, 1883), Farmer's Bank (c. 1883), Berlin Building (1883), Geary Building (1887), and the Lutheran Church (1881).  Also included is the oldest portion of the Bridgewater College campus, consisting of five fine brick collegiate buildings constructed before 1911.

It was listed on the National Register of Historic Places in 1984.

References

Historic districts in Rockingham County, Virginia
Victorian architecture in Virginia
National Register of Historic Places in Rockingham County, Virginia
Historic districts on the National Register of Historic Places in Virginia